Ramon Edward "Ray" DeCola (September 17, 1930 – April 3, 2017) was an American football coach. A 1953 graduate of West Liberty University in West Liberty, West Virginia, he began his career as a high school coach at various stops including New Albany, St. Mary's, Johnstown, and Urbana in Ohio where he accumulated a record of 177–54–6 over 24 seasons.

From 1985 to 1987, he was the head coach of the resurrected football program at Urbana University in Urbana, Ohio where compiled a 9–9–1.

Head coaching record

College

References

External links
 West Liberty Hall of Fame profile
 

1930 births
2017 deaths
Urbana Blue Knights football coaches
West Liberty Hilltoppers baseball players
West Liberty Hilltoppers football players
High school football coaches in Ohio
People from Belmont County, Ohio